Raja Badhe (1912–1977) was a Marathi poet from Maharashtra, India. He first made his name in Nagpur as a poet. Later he moved to Mumbai. He worked for All India Radio for some time.

Badhe produced a film on Chatrapati Shivaji Maharaj.

Many of Badhe's songs were recorded. When "Prakash Pictures" approached V. D. Savarkar to write songs for their film "Ram-Rajya", he advised them to get them written by Badhe.

He died suddenly in Delhi. He had never married.

A prominent traffic intersection in Mumbai, "Raja Badhe Chowk", is named after him.
He was very well remembered for prominent contribution in translation of GATHA SAPTASHATI
( Collection of poems compiled by RAJA HAL SATVAHAN – ANCIENT RULER OF MAHARASHTRA.about 270 BC.

The following are the titles of some songs written by Badhe:

 Jai Jai Maharashtra Maza, sung by Shahir Sable
 Hasates Ashi Ka Mani, sung by Lata Mangeshkar
 Chandane Shimpit Jashi, composed by Hridaynath Mangeshkar
 Sujan Ho Parisa Ram-katha, a song from film "Ram Rajya" (1943)

External links 
 Lyrics of two songs written by Badhe

Marathi-language writers
Writers from Nagpur
1912 births
1977 deaths
Marathi people
Marathi-language poets
Indian lyricists
20th-century Indian poets
Indian male poets
Poets from Maharashtra
20th-century Indian male writers